The Weaver House, also known as Waller, is a historic home located at Cowie Corner, Greensville County, Virginia. It was built between 1838 and 1840 for Jarrad Weaver on land which had belonged to the Waller family of Williamsburg.  It is a two-story, single-pile, wood frame residence.  It sits on a brick basement and has a standing-seam sheet metal gable roof.  The front facade features a hipped-roof porch with square columns.

It was listed on the National Register of Historic Places in 1982.

References

Houses on the National Register of Historic Places in Virginia
Houses completed in 1840
Houses in Greensville County, Virginia
National Register of Historic Places in Greensville County, Virginia